Anonima Petroli Italiana  or simply api (in lower case) is a large oil company in Italy. It is a provider of crude oil for the petrochemical industry and a distributor of petroleum products. It is the most important subsidiary of the holding company Gruppo api (api Group), which also includes api Raffineria di Ancona SpA, api Energia SpA, Festival SpA, apioil Ltd, api GmbH and api Services Ltd. It is headquartered in Rome, Italy.

Description
The company was founded in Ancona in 1933 by Ferdinando Peretti. It operates as a strategic coordinator of all api group's activities, through the direct supplying of semi-finished crude oil and assigned in the production, the acquisition of finished products and their transport, the exchanges with other oil companies to optimize the distributive logistics, the complementary activity of trading of crude oil and by-products to clients, and the sale of all the by-products in Italy and to foreign countries. It also is dedicated to operate and develop oil and gas field properties. It owns a refinery in Ancona with a capacity of 3.9 million tonnes/year and an electric power plant of 250 MW.

In 2005, it acquired the IP gas station chain from ENI.  After a few years running the chains in parallel, it switched all its stations to a revamped IP image and now supplies around 4,200 filling stations (up from around 1,600 at the time of the acquisition) with a market share of 11%.

In 2017, Total SA and ERG SpA signed an agreement with Anonima Petroli Italiana SpA, to sell the fuel marketing and refining assets in their TotalErg joint venture. Total has stated that the reason behind this divestment is that the Italian fuel market is highly fragmented and the company's expectations for profitability have not been met.

The company derives its revenue from two main sources. Firstly, they distribute semi-finished crude oil products to customers to use in the rubber and other associated industries. These products are being sold in both domestic and international markets. Secondly, the company generates income from the ownership and operations of the IP gas station chain. After purchasing 2,600 gas stations from the company ENI, API currently manages over 4,200 gas stations, which are supported by the company's own oil products.

References

official company site

Electric power companies of Italy
Oil and gas companies of Italy